The Fifth Son of the Shoemaker is a book by Donald Corley, illustrated by the author. It was his best known work and his only novel, though according to Lin Carter it is actually "a volume of short stories under the guise of a novel." The book was first published in hardcover in New York by Robert M. McBride in September 1930.

Plot
The book concerns the story of a Russian family of hereditary shoemakers who have immigrated from Moscow to New York, their establishment in a humble East Side cellar, rise from rags to riches, and travels around the world.

Reception
The New York Times called the novel Corley's "best-known work."

Lin Carter describes Corley's style as possessing a quality of "gorgeousness", which he characterizes as having "the sort of verbal richness that bejewels the pages of Clark Ashton Smith's work or the Arabian Nights ... lazy and singing, [with] a certain playfulness to it ..."

Notes

1930 American novels
Novels set in New York City
Fiction about shoemakers
Family saga novels
1930 debut novels